BetOnline is a privately held online gambling company offering sports betting, online casinos, poker and wagering on horse racing. The company's CEO is Eddie Robbins III. In 2006, according to Casino City Press, BetOnline.com was among the top 60 online sportsbook, racebook, and betting exchanges, by overall traffic received. The site has been in operation at least since 2001.

Innovations
BetOnline has publicized some of its more innovative approaches to online gaming. In 2009, the company set out to place and accept the first wager from the summit of Mount Everest. Hiring a veteran climber, Tim Rippel, the company promised to donate $20,000 to a popular charity (as chosen by voters on Facebook and Twitter) upon successfully summiting the peak and placing a bet. While the climbing team was unable to place a bet from the summit, a wager was placed on May 18, 2009 (local time) from “Base Camp 4” at 26,000 feet above sea level. The bet was a winner, wagering that the Los Angeles Lakers would cover the spread against the Houston Rockets in Game 7 of the NBA Western Conference Semifinals. BetOnline still donated the $20,000 across three top vote-getting charities.
 
BetOnline becomes one of the first online poker rooms to use the cryptocurrency bitcoin.

Domain Name
BetOnline has switched to the Betonline.ag domain name. Their Betonline.com domain is still active but they told their partners that the Betonline.ag domain will be their primary address starting on April 4, 2012.

Live Dealer Blackjack Controversy 
An online video of a blackjack hand surfaced which caused a lot of controversy. The video shows the dealer switching cards to change the hand, resulting in numerous players to lose.
Due to the scandal, on February 18, 2017, BetOnline officially ended their relationship with 3rd party dealing vendor Global Gaming Labs and partnered up with Visionary iGaming for their "Live Dealer" services.

References

External links
 Official website
 

Online gambling companies of Panama
Companies based in Panama City
Internet properties established in 2004